Stregoneria is the word in Italian that is commonly translated into English as the word witchcraft. In the Italian dictionary—Vocabolario della Lingua (Nicola Zanichelli, 1970)—stregoneria is defined as a magical practice intended to produce harm or illness. The statement that stregoneria refers to a harmful magical practice is supported by ethnologist Elsa Guggino, who states that words related to stregoneria are always used disparagingly to describe someone practicing malevolent magic (Stregoneria: The "Old Religion" in Italy from Historical to Modern Times, by Marguerite Rigoglioso, 2000).  This is also noted by scholar Gary R. Varner, in his book Charles G. Leland: The Man & the Myth, in which he states that the word strega (witch) is a disparaging term used to denote those who practice black magic, and that the term "maga" is used to denote those who practice white magic and healing.

Anthropologist Sabina Magliocco, in her article titled "Spells, Saints and Streghe: Folk Magic and Healing in Italy," remarks that "At one time, many villages had a number of folk healers who could cure a variety of illnesses, They ranged from those who cured with herbs, magic formulas and prayers to professional sorcerers who were called in serious cases of magical attack. In practice, however, these practitioners overlapped, since almost any illness could be judged to be the result of a magical working. Folk healers seldom referred to themselves as streghe (although their neighbors might call them such), but as fattucchiere, "fixers," maghi (masculine plural; singular mago), maghe (feminine plural; sing. maga), "magic-workers."
 
In contrast to the academic and historical evidence some modern practitioners of Stregoneria claim it is the Folk Magic practices of Italy. The use of the word Stregoneria to describe Italian Folk Magic is common mostly among Italian-American practitioners. Practitioners of Folk Magic traditionally would usually be called something along the lines of fixers, healers, or those who help, but to be called a witch would be a direct insult. Virtually all practitioners would have considered themselves Roman Catholic and witches in Italian folklore and Roman Catholicism are traditionally connected to the devil. 

Practices of Stregoneria include making Brevi, or charm bags, and healing the Malocchio  Although Stregoneria does indeed make use of a variety of Catholic practices, due to the use of magic Stregoneria, unlike Benedicaria, tends to be more at odds with the teachings of the Catholic Church, blending Catholic and Pre-Christian traditions.

Stregoneria and Benedicaria
Benedicaria is Italian Folk Catholicism that, in its purest form, is completely in line with the teachings of the Catholic Church. Stregoneria and Benedicaria often overlap, specifically in the intercession of the Saints, Catholic prayers, and the use of Catholic Sacramentals. Many practitioners of both Benedicaria and Stregoneria typically make use of each other’s practices to the point where it’s almost impossible to see where one ends and the other begins.

Stregoneria and Stregheria
Stregheria is the American religious practice of witchcraft with roots in Italy.  It was popularized by author Raven Grimassi, and is reflective of Neo-Paganism, and makes use of much of the magical practices of Stregoneria but does not include elements of Catholic-based folk magic, which displaced the pre-Christian enchanted worldview in Italian culture.

See also
Benedicaria
Cornicello
Folk Christianity
Folk Medicine
Malocchio
Italian Cunning Folk
Witches of Benevento

External links
Southern Italian Traditionalist Craft 

Italian traditions

Witchcraft in Italy